Ozzy & Drix is an American animated television series based on the 2001 film Osmosis Jones. It serves as a spiritual successor to the film. It centers on Osmosis "Ozzy" Jones, a cheeky-chappy white blood cell, and Drix, a level-headed cold pill, who battle germs and viruses inside the body of teenage boy Hector Cruz. The series is set in a stylized version of the human body, which resembles a city where microorganisms and cells are anthropomorphic.

Produced by Conundrum Entertainment and Warner Bros. Animation, the series aired on Kids' WB for two seasons and 26 episodes from 2002 to 2004. It also aired on Cartoon Network from 2004 to 2006.

Premise

At the beginning of the series, Osmosis "Ozzy" Jones (Phil LaMarr), a white blood cell with an impulsive personality and a penchant for challenging authority, and Drix (Jeff Bennett), a straight-laced and by-the-books cold pill, pursue a scarlet fever bacterium (Tim Curry). During the chase, the three get sucked up by a mosquito from their host body Frank DeTorre (Jeff Bennett) (who has recently resumed his poor eating habits) (it is possible that this is a different version of the series as opposed to the movie) and are transported to the body of a teenage boy named Hector Cruz (Justin Cowden). After defeating the virus and settling into their new home, Ozzy and Drix are hired as private investigators, vowing to protect Hector's health and guide him through the misadventures of adolescence.

Supporting characters include Maria Amino (Tasia Valenza), a white blood cell cop who is highly skilled at fighting and also becomes a love interest for Drix; Mayor Paul Spryman (Alanna Ubach), the immature teenage mayor of the city of Hector; Chief Gluteus (Jim Cummings), a stern muscle cell who serves as the city's police chief and Maria's superior; Ellen Patella (Vivica A. Fox), an attorney-at-law who helps cells find homes in Hector, and who becomes Ozzy's new love interest to replace Leah Estrogen after forever leaving her and Frank; and the Brain Cell Advisors (Pat Fraley), advisors who help Mayor Spryman run the city due to Spryman being incompetent in his job.

Recurring characters include The Mole (Jeffrey Tambor), a former secret agent who holds information on what is happening within Hector; Dander (Frank Welker), Drix's pet dog germ formed from the saliva of Hector's dog Uno; Christine Kolchuck (Kimberly Brooks), a friendly student who Hector has a crush on and looks out for Hector; Travis Lum (Rob Paulsen), Hector's classmate and best friend who also looks out for him; Ernst Strepfinger (Brad Garrett in season 1, Cummings in season 2), a villainous germ who uses a gang of germs and viruses to carry out his dirty work; Uno (Frank Welker), Hector's dog whom he adopted in "Oh, My Dog"; and Hector's supportive parents, Mr. and Mrs. Cruz (Alanna Ubach and Joe Lala), who look after Hector's well-being.

Unlike the original film it was spun-off from, Ozzy & Drix was entirely animated and contained no live-action scenes. The series was also less intense and contained no adult humor unlike the film. The voices of Ozzy and Drix were recast with LaMarr replacing Chris Rock as Ozzy and Bennett replacing David Hyde Pierce as Drix. In multiple episodes, producer Ron Myrick integrated stock footage from the original film such as the human body's traffic, the inside of the mouth, and the dam bursting in the runny nose.

Ozzy and Drix (not counting this show's version of Frank as he only appears in the first episode and made a small cameo in the ninth episode) are only two of the characters to return. Ozzy's girlfriend Leah, along with Phlegmming, Tom Colonic, Mrs. Boyd, Frank's daughter Shane, and Bob do not appear nor mentioned in the series.

Episodes

Series overview

Season 1 (2002–2003)

Season 2 (2003–2004)

Home media
The complete series was released on DVD on June 20, 2017 as manufactured on demand (MOD) on DVD-R and part of the Warner Archive Collection.

References

External links

 
 Ozza & Drix at the Big Cartoon Database

Episode list using the default LineColor
2000s American animated television series
2000s American comic science fiction television series
2002 American television series debuts
2004 American television series endings
Kids' WB original shows
American animated television spin-offs
American children's animated action television series
American children's animated adventure television series
American children's animated comic science fiction television series
American children's animated science fantasy television series
American sequel television series
Anime-influenced Western animated television series
Human body in popular culture
Osmosis Jones
Animated television shows based on films
Television shows set in Washington (state)
Television series by Warner Bros. Animation
Animated television series about robots
Animated television series about families
The WB original programming